Saratoga Avenue station may refer to:
 Saratoga Avenue (IRT New Lots Line), a station on the IRT New Lots Line
 Saratoga Avenue (BMT Fulton Street Line), a station on the demolished BMT Fulton Street Line